Sri Subang Komuter station is a proposed KTM Komuter commuter train halt located in Subang, Selangor, Malaysia. The halt will be built as part of the Subang Skypark extension line, branching off from the Port Klang Line at Subang Jaya Komuter station and ending at Subang Skypark Komuter station.

References

Petaling District
Railway stations in Selangor
Port Klang Line